Bryan Douglas Schroder (born February 3, 1959) is an American attorney who served as the United States attorney for the District of Alaska from 2017 to 2021.

Education
He earned a Bachelor of Science degree in government from the United States Coast Guard Academy in 1981 and a Juris Doctor from the University of Washington School of Law in 1991.

Career 
Schroder has worked at the U.S. Attorney's Office in the District of Alaska since 2005. Before becoming the U.S. attorney, he was the first assistant U.S. attorney, chief of the criminal division, anti-terrorism prosecutor, and district ethics adviser. He has prosecuted cases involving violent crimes, drug distribution, gun crimes, fraud, tax evasion, environmental crimes, and fisheries and wildlife offenses.

He was nominated to be the United States attorney on July 27, 2017, and was confirmed by the United States Senate on November 9, 2017.

Schroder served 24 years in the United States Coast Guard (1981–2005) in Seattle, Long Beach, California, and San Diego. He then served as a judge advocate in Juneau, Anchorage, Miami, New York, and Colorado Springs. He retired as a Captain. He is an Eagle Scout. On February 8, 2021, he along with 55 other attorneys were asked to resign.

References

1959 births
Living people
21st-century American lawyers
Assistant United States Attorneys
United States Attorneys for the District of Alaska
United States Coast Guard captains
United States Coast Guard Academy alumni
University of Washington School of Law alumni